Sovietske is an urban-type settlement in the Yalta Municipality of the Autonomous Republic of Crimea, a territory recognized by a majority of countries as part of Ukraine and annexed by Russia as the Republic of Crimea.

The settlement was first founded in 1929 after the creation of the "Dolossi" resort hotel. It is administratively subordinate to the Massandra Settlement Council. Its population was 511 in the 2001 Ukrainian census. Current population:

References

Urban-type settlements in Crimea
Seaside resorts in Russia
Seaside resorts in Ukraine
Yalta Municipality
Populated places established in 1929